Kaitlan Leaney (born 10 October 2000) is an Australian rugby union player. She plays Lock for Australia and the Waratahs. Leaney made her international debut for the Wallaroos against Fiji on 6 May 2022 at the Suncorp Stadium in Brisbane. She also played against Japan in a shocking 12–10 loss.

Leaney was named in Australia's squad for the 2022 Pacific Four Series in New Zealand. She was selected again in the Wallaroos squad for a two-test series against the Black Ferns at the Laurie O'Reilly Cup. She made the team again for the delayed 2022 Rugby World Cup in New Zealand.

References

External links
Wallaroos Profile

2000 births
Living people
Australia women's international rugby union players
Australian female rugby union players